Trachelostenus is a genus of beetles belonging to Tenebrionoidea. It is native to the Valdivian forests of Chile, and has at least two species, T. inaequalis (Solier) and T. fascicularis (Philipp). It was historically considered the only member of the family Trachelostenidae, but a 2015 study sunk the genus into the tenebrionid (darkling beetle) subfamily Tenebrioninae.

References

Tenebrionoidea
Fauna of the Valdivian temperate rainforest